SIC Insurance Company (formerly called State Insurance Corporation) is a Ghanaian insurance company.
They are listed on the stock index of the Ghana Stock Exchange, the GSE All-Share Index. It formed in February 1962. Recently its expansion plans were shelved due to the Ebola virus.

Operations

Products
SIC Insurance writes virtually all classes of short-term insurance including five which cover motor, fire, marine, aviation, and general accident, and policies for the hospitality industry.

Oil and gas
In the light of the oil find along the western coast of Ghana, SIC Insurance positioned itself to underwrite oil and gas and other ancillary business in Ghana. Further to this, Ghana Insurers Association (GIA) as a way of building capacity and positioning itself to adequately handle all related insurances on oil and energy risks, and form a pool. All insurances relating to exploration, drilling, through to the production of oil and gas are placed in the pool and the core responsibility of the entire portfolio is managed by the appointed Manager. SIC Insurance was appointed as the pool manager based on their capital base, human resource capacity, and track record among other things. SIC Insurance's responsibility involves dealing with all the Ghana insurance companies participating in the pool, the clients and other stakeholders as well as the overseas re-insurers.

Market share
SIC Insurance is the leading provider of non-life insurance products in Ghana with an estimated market share of over 25%. The company exceeds the minimum stated capital requirement of US$1 million (GH¢1.42 million) set by the National Insurance Commission of Ghana.

References

External links
SIC Insurance Company official homepage
SIC Insurance Company - Annual Report 2010 
GhanaWeb.com
SIC Insurance Company at Ghanastocks.net
SIC Insurance Company at Alacrastore

Insurance companies of Ghana
Companies based in Accra
Financial services companies established in 1962
1962 establishments in Ghana
Companies listed on the Ghana Stock Exchange